is a station on the Tama Toshi Monorail Line in Hino, Tokyo, Japan.

Lines
Manganji Station is a station on the Tama Toshi Monorail Line and is located 9.3 kilometers from the terminus of the line at Kamikitadai Station.

Station layout
Manganji Station is a raised station with two tracks and two opposed side platforms, with the station building located underneath. It is a standardized station building for this monorail line.

Platforms

History
The station opened on 10 January 2000.

Station numbering was introduced in February 2018 with Manganji being assigned TT08.

Surrounding area
The station is above Tokyo Metropolitan Route 503 at its intersection with National Route 20 (Hino Bypass). Atagosan Sekidenji, the birthplace and gravesite of the former deputy leader of the Shinsengumi, Hijikata Toshizō, is located nearby.
Other points of interest include:
 Tokyo Bureau of Sewerage Asagawa Water Reclamation Center
 Hino City Clean Center
 Tokyo Metropolitan Hino Senior High School
 Sekiden Bridge
 Hino Tax Office

References

External links

 Tama Monorail Manganji Station 
 Hijikata Toshizō Museum 

Railway stations in Japan opened in 2000
Railway stations in Tokyo
Tama Toshi Monorail
Hino, Tokyo